Lilia Aragón (born Lilia Isabel Aragón del Rivero, 22 September 1938 – 2 August 2021) was a Mexican film, television, and stage actress and politician. She was the Secretary of the National Association of Actors.

She also served as Deputy of the LIX Legislature of the Mexican Congress representing the Federal District as replacement of Elba Esther Gordillo.

Selected filmography

Telenovelas

Series
 Como dice el dicho (2012–2016) as Various characters

Film
 The Garden of Aunt Isabel (1971)

References

External links

1938 births
2021 deaths
Mexican telenovela actresses
Mexican television actresses
Mexican film actresses
Mexican stage actresses
Actresses from Morelos
People from Cuautla
20th-century Mexican actresses
21st-century Mexican actresses
Members of the Chamber of Deputies (Mexico) for Mexico City
Institutional Revolutionary Party politicians
21st-century Mexican politicians
21st-century Mexican women politicians
Deputies of the LIX Legislature of Mexico
Women members of the Chamber of Deputies (Mexico)